Hylton Jolliffe  (28 February 1773 – 13 January 1843) was an English politician.

Joliffe was the eldest son of William Jolliffe (1745–1802) of Merstham and his wife Eleanor, daughter and heir of Sir Richard Hylton, 5th Baronet, of Hayton Castle in Cumberland.  He was educated at Westminster School and at Lincoln's Inn. In 1804 he married Elizabeth Rose, the illegitimate daughter of Robert Shirley, 7th Earl Ferrers.  The couple had no children, but Joliffe fathered two illegitimate sons.

He was a Member of Parliament (MP) for the borough of Petersfield for most of the period between 1796 and 1834.
His father represented the same borough for 34 years, and the two served alongside each other from 1796 to 1797.

References

External links 
 
 

1773 births
1843 deaths
Members of the Parliament of Great Britain for English constituencies
British MPs 1796–1800
Conservative Party (UK) MPs for English constituencies
UK MPs 1802–1806
UK MPs 1806–1807
UK MPs 1807–1812
UK MPs 1812–1818
UK MPs 1818–1820
UK MPs 1820–1826
UK MPs 1826–1830
UK MPs 1831–1832
People educated at Westminster School, London
Members of Lincoln's Inn
UK MPs 1832–1835
Hylton
Tory MPs (pre-1834)